The Boeing KC-135 Stratotanker is an American military aerial refueling tanker aircraft that was developed from the Boeing 367-80 prototype, alongside the Boeing 707 airliner. It has a narrower fuselage and is shorter than the 707. Boeing gave the aircraft the internal designation of Model 717. The KC-135 was the United States Air Force's first jet-powered refueling tanker and replaced the KC-97 Stratofreighter. The KC-135 was initially tasked with refueling strategic bombers, but it was used extensively in the Vietnam War and later conflicts such as Operation Desert Storm to extend the range and endurance of US tactical fighters and bombers.

The KC-135 entered service with the United States Air Force (USAF) in 1957; it is one of nine military fixed-wing aircraft with over 60 years of continuous service with its original operator.  The KC-135 is supplemented by the larger McDonnell Douglas KC-10 Extender.  Studies have concluded that many of the aircraft could be flown until 2030, although maintenance costs have greatly increased. The KC-135 is to be partially replaced by the Boeing KC-46 Pegasus.

Development

Background
Starting in 1950 the Air Force operated the world's first production aerial tanker, the Boeing KC-97 Stratofreighter, a gasoline fueled piston-engined Boeing Stratocruiser (USAF designation C-97 Stratofreighter) with a Boeing-developed flying boom and extra kerosene (jet fuel) tanks feeding the boom. The Stratocruiser airliner itself was developed from the B-29 bomber after World War II. In the KC-97, the mixed gasoline/kerosene fuel system was clearly not desirable and it was obvious that a jet-powered tanker aircraft would be the next development, having a single type of fuel for both its own engines and for passing to receiver aircraft. The 230 mph (370 km/h) cruise speed of the slower, piston-engined KC-97 was also a serious issue, as using it as an aerial tanker forced the newer jet-powered military aircraft to slow down to mate with the tanker's boom.

Like its sibling, the commercial Boeing 707 jet airliner, the KC-135 was derived from the Boeing 367-80 jet transport "proof of concept" demonstrator, which was commonly called the "Dash-80".  The KC-135 is similar in appearance to the 707, but has a narrower fuselage and is shorter than the 707.  The KC-135 predates the 707, and is structurally quite different from the civilian airliner.  Boeing gave the future KC-135 tanker the initial designation Model 717.

In 1954 USAF's Strategic Air Command (SAC) held a competition for a jet-powered aerial refueling tanker. Lockheed's tanker version of the proposed Lockheed L-193 airliner with rear fuselage-mounted engines was declared the winner in 1955. Since Boeing's proposal was already flying, the KC-135 could be delivered two years earlier and Air Force Secretary Harold E. Talbott ordered 250 KC-135 tankers until Lockheed's design could be manufactured. In the end, orders for the Lockheed tanker were dropped rather than supporting two tanker designs. Lockheed never produced its jet airliner, while Boeing would eventually dominate the market with a family of airliners based on the 707.

In 1954, the Air Force placed an initial order for 29 KC-135As, the first of an eventual 820 of all variants of the basic C-135 family.  The first aircraft flew in August 1956 and the initial production Stratotanker was delivered to Castle Air Force Base, California, in June 1957.  The last KC-135 was delivered to the Air Force in 1965.

Developed in the early 1950s, the basic airframe is characterized by 35-degree aft swept wings and tail, four underwing-mounted engine pods, a horizontal stabilizer mounted on the fuselage near the bottom of the vertical stabilizer with positive dihedral on the two horizontal planes and a hi-frequency radio antenna which protrudes forward from the top of the vertical fin or stabilizer. These basic features make it strongly resemble the commercial Boeing 707 and 720 aircraft, although it is actually a different aircraft.

Reconnaissance and command post variants of the aircraft, including the RC-135 Rivet Joint and EC-135 Looking Glass aircraft were operated by SAC from 1963 through 1992, when they were reassigned to the Air Combat Command (ACC).  The USAF EC-135 Looking Glass was subsequently replaced in its role by the U.S. Navy E-6 Mercury aircraft, a new build airframe based on the Boeing 707-320B.

Engine retrofits 
Wet thrust is achieved through the use of water injection on takeoff, as opposed to "wet thrust" when used to describe an afterburning engine.  of water are injected into the engines over the course of three minutes. The water is injected into the inlet and the diffuser case in front of the combustion case. The water cools the air in the engine to increase its density; it also reduces the turbine gas temperature, which is a primary limitation on many jet engines. This allows the use of more fuel for proper combustion and creates more thrust for short periods of time, similar in concept to "War Emergency Power" in a piston-engined aircraft.

In the 1980s, the first modification program retrofitted 157 Air Force Reserve (AFRES) and Air National Guard (ANG) tankers with the Pratt & Whitney TF33-PW-102 turbofan engines from 707 airliners retired in the late 1970s and early 1980s.  The modified tanker, designated the KC-135E, was 14% more fuel-efficient than the KC-135A and could offload 20% more fuel on long-duration flights. Only the KC-135E aircraft were equipped with thrust reversers for aborted takeoffs and shorter landing roll-outs. The KC-135E fleet has since either been retrofitted as the R-model configuration or placed into long-term storage ("XJ"), as Congress has prevented the Air Force from formally retiring them. The final KC-135E, tail number 56-3630, was delivered by the 101st Air Refueling Wing to the 309th Aerospace Maintenance and Regeneration Group (AMARG) at Davis–Monthan Air Force Base in September 2009.

The second modification program retrofitted 500 aircraft with new CFM International CFM56 (military designation: F108) high-bypass turbofan engines produced by General Electric and Safran. The modified tanker, designated KC-135R (modified KC-135A or E) or KC-135T (modified KC-135Q), can offload up to 50% more fuel (on a long-duration sortie), is 25% more fuel-efficient, and costs 25% less to operate than with the previous engines. It is also significantly quieter than the KC-135A, with noise levels at takeoff reduced from 126 to 99 decibels.

The KC-135R's operational range is 60% greater than the KC-135E for comparable fuel offloads, providing a wider range of basing options.

Upgrading the remaining KC-135Es into KC-135Rs is no longer in consideration; this would have cost approximately US$3 billion, $24 million per aircraft. According to Air Force data, the KC-135 fleet had a total operation and support cost in fiscal year 2001 of about $2.2 billion. The older E model aircraft averaged total costs of about $4.6 million per aircraft, while the R models averaged about $3.7 million per aircraft.  Those costs include personnel, fuel, maintenance, modifications, and spare parts.

Avionics upgrades

In order to expand the KC-135's capabilities and improve its reliability, the aircraft has undergone a number of avionics upgrades. Among these was the Pacer-CRAG program (compass, radar and GPS) which ran from 1999 to 2002 and modified all the aircraft in the inventory to eliminate the Navigator position from the flight crew. The fuel management system was also replaced. The program development was done by Rockwell Collins in Iowa and installation was performed by BAE Systems at the Mojave Airport in California. Block 40.6 allows the KC-135 to comply with global air-traffic management. The latest block upgrade to the KC-135, the Block 45 program, is online with the first 45 upgraded aircraft delivered by January 2017. Block 45 adds a new glass cockpit digital display, radio altimeter, digital autopilot, digital flight director and computer updates. The original, no longer procurable, analog instruments, including all engine gauges, were replaced. Rockwell Collins again supplied the major avionic modules, with modification  done at Tinker AFB.

Further upgrades and derivatives
The KC-135Q variant was modified to carry JP-7 fuel necessary for the Lockheed SR-71 Blackbird by separating the JP-7 from the KC-135's own fuel supply (the body tanks carrying JP-7, and the wing tanks carrying JP-4 or JP-8). The tanker also had special fuel systems for moving the different fuels between different tanks. When the KC-135Q model received the CFM56 engines, it was redesignated the KC-135T model, which was capable of separating the main body tanks from the wing tanks where the KC-135 draws its engine fuel. The only external difference between a KC-135R and a KC-135T is the presence of a clear window on the underside of the empennage of the KC-135T where a remote controlled searchlight is mounted.  It also has two ground refueling ports, located in each rear wheel well so ground crews can fuel both the body tanks and wing tanks separately.

Eight KC-135R aircraft are receiver-capable tankers, commonly referred to as KC-135R(RT).  All eight aircraft were with the 22d Air Refueling Wing at McConnell AFB, Kansas, in 1994. They are primarily used for force extension and Special Operations missions, and are crewed by highly qualified receiver capable crews.  If not used for the receiver mission, these aircraft can be flown just like any other KC-135R.

The Multi-point Refueling Systems (MPRS) modification adds refueling pods to the KC-135's wings.  The pods allow refueling of U.S. Navy, U.S. Marine Corps and most NATO tactical jet aircraft while keeping the tail-mounted refueling boom. The pods themselves are Flight Refueling Limited MK.32B model pods, and refuel via the probe and drogue method common to Navy/Marine Corps tactical jets, rather than the primary "flying boom" method used by Air Force fixed-wing aircraft. This allows the tanker to refuel two receivers at the same time, which increases throughput compared to the boom drogue adapter.

A number of KC-135A and KC-135B aircraft have been modified to EC-135, RC-135 and OC-135 configurations for use in several different roles (although these could also be considered variants of the C-135 Stratolifter family).

Design

Nearly all internal fuel can be pumped through the tanker's flying boom, the KC-135's primary fuel transfer method. A boom operator stationed in the rear of the aircraft controls the boom while lying prone, viewing through a window at the bottom of the tail. Both the flying boom and operator's station are similar to those of the previous KC-97. A special shuttlecock-shaped drogue, attached to and trailing behind the flying boom, may be used to refuel aircraft fitted with probes. This apparatus is significantly more unforgiving of pilot error in the receiving aircraft than conventional trailing hose arrangements; an aircraft so fitted is also incapable of refueling by the normal flying boom method until the attachment is removed. A cargo deck above the refueling system can hold a mixed load of passengers and cargo.

Operational history

Introduction into service

The KC-135 was initially purchased to support bombers of the Strategic Air Command, but by the late 1960s, in the Southeast Asia theater, the KC-135 Stratotanker's ability as a force multiplier came to the fore. Midair refueling of F-105 and F-4 fighter-bombers as well as B-52 bombers brought far-flung bombing targets within reach, and allowed fighter missions to spend hours at the front, rather than a few minutes, which was usual due to their limited fuel reserves and high fuel consumption. KC-135 crews refueled both Air Force and Navy / Marine Corps aircraft; though they would have to change to probe and drogue adapters depending upon the mission, the Navy and Marine Corps not having fitted their aircraft with flying boom receptacles since the USAF boom system was impractical for aircraft carrier operations. Crews also helped to bring in damaged aircraft which could sometimes fly while being fed by fuel to a landing site or to ditch over the water (specifically those with punctured fuel tanks).  KC-135s continued their tactical support role in later conflicts such as Operation Desert Storm and current aerial strategy.

SAC had the KC-135 Stratotanker in service with Regular Air Force SAC units from 1957 through 1992 and with SAC-gained ANG and AFRES units from 1975 through 1992. Following a major USAF reorganization that resulted in the inactivation of SAC in 1992, most KC-135s were reassigned to the newly created AMC. While AMC gained the preponderance of the aerial refueling mission, a small number of KC-135s were also assigned directly to United States Air Forces in Europe (USAFE), Pacific Air Forces (PACAF) and the Air Education and Training Command (AETC).  All AFRC KC-135s and most of the ANG KC-135 fleet became operationally-gained by AMC, while Alaska Air National Guard and Hawaii Air National Guard KC-135s became operationally-gained by PACAF.

AMC manages 396 Stratotankers, of which the AFRC and ANG fly 243 in support of AMC's mission as of May 2018. The KC-135 is one of a few military aircraft types with over 50 years of continuous service with its original operator as of 2009.

Israel was offered KC-135s again in 2013, after turning down the aging aircraft twice due to expense of keeping them flying. The IAF again rejected the offered KC-135Es, but said that it would consider up to a dozen of the newer KC-135Rs.

Research usage

Besides its primary role as an inflight aircraft refueler, the KC-135, designated NKC-135, has assisted in several research projects at the NASA Armstrong Flight Research Center at Edwards Air Force Base, California.  One such project occurred between 1979 and 1980 when special wingtip "winglets", developed by Richard Whitcomb of the Langley Research Center, were tested at Armstrong, using an NKC-135A tanker loaned to NASA by the Air Force.  Winglets are small, nearly vertical fins installed on an aircraft's wing tips.  The results of the research showed that drag was reduced and range could be increased by as much as 7 percent at cruise speeds. Winglets are now being incorporated into most new commercial and military transport/passenger jets, as well as business aviation jets.

NASA also has operated several KC-135 aircraft (without the tanker equipment installed) as their famed Vomit Comet zero-gravity simulator aircraft.  The longest-serving (1973 to 1995) version was KC-135A, AF Ser. No. 59-1481, named Weightless Wonder IV and registered as N930NA.

Replacements

Between 1993 and 2003, the amount of KC-135 depot maintenance work doubled, and the overhaul cost per aircraft tripled. In 1996, it cost $8,400 per flight hour for the KC-135, and in 2002 this had grown to $11,000.  The Air Force's 15-year estimates project further significant cost growth through fiscal year 2017. KC-135 fleet operations and support costs were estimated to grow from about $2.2 billion in fiscal year 2003 to $5.1 billion (2003 dollars) in fiscal year 2017, an increase of over 130 percent, which represented an annual operating cost growth rate of about 6.2 percent.

The Air Force projected that E and R models have lifetime flying hour limits of 36,000 and 39,000 hours, respectively.  According to the Air Force, only a few KC-135s would reach these limits by 2040, when some aircraft would be about 80 years old. A later 2005 Air Force study estimated that KC-135Es upgraded to the R standard could remain in use until 2030.

In 2006, the KC-135E fleet was flying an annual average of 350 hours per aircraft and the KC-135R fleet was flying an annual average of 710 hours per aircraft.  The KC-135 fleet is currently flying double its planned yearly flying hour program to meet airborne refueling requirements, and has resulted in higher than forecast usage and sustainment costs. In March 2009, the Air Force indicated that KC-135s would require additional skin replacement to allow their continued use beyond 2018.

The USAF decided to replace the KC-135 fleet.  However, the fleet is large and will need to be replaced gradually.  Initially the first batch of replacement planes was to be an air tanker version of the Boeing 767, leased from Boeing.  In 2003, this was changed to contract where the Air Force would purchase 80 KC-767 aircraft and lease 20 more. In December 2003, the Pentagon froze the contract and in January 2006, the KC-767 contract was canceled.  This move followed public revelations of corruption in how the contract was awarded, as well as controversy regarding the original leasing rather than outright purchase agreement.  The then Secretary of Defense Rumsfeld stated that that move would in no way impair the Air Force's ability to deliver the mission of the KC-767, which would be accomplished by implementing continuing upgrades to the KC-135 and KC-10 Extender fleet.

In January 2007, the U.S. Air Force formally launched the KC-X program, with a request for proposal (RFP).  KC-X was the first phase of three acquisition programs meant to replace the KC-135 fleet. On 29 February 2008, the US Defense Department announced that it had selected the EADS/Northrop Grumman "KC-30" (to be designated the KC-45A) over the Boeing KC-767. Boeing protested the award on 11 March 2008, citing irregularities in the competition and bid evaluation. On 18 June 2008, the US Government Accountability Office sustained Boeing's protest of the selection of the Northrop Grumman/EADS's tanker. In February 2010, the US Air Force restarted the KC-X competition with the release of a revised request for proposal (RFP). After evaluating bids, the USAF selected Boeing's 767-based tanker design, with the military designation KC-46, as a replacement in February 2011. The first KC-46A Pegasus was delivered to the U.S. Air Force on 10 January 2019.

Two foreign users of the KC-135, the French Air Force and the Republic of Singapore Air Force took deliveries of Airbus A330 MRTTs as replacements for their Stratotankers.

Variants

KC-135A
Original production version powered by four Pratt & Whitney J57s, 732 built. Given the Boeing model numbers 717-100A, 717-146 and 717-148.
NKC-135A
Test-configured KC-135A.
KC-135B
Airborne command post version equipped with turbofan engines, 17 built.  Provided with in-flight refueling capability and redesignated EC-135C. Given the model number 717-166.
KC-135D
All four RC-135As (Pacer Swan) were modified to partial KC-135A configuration in 1979. The four aircraft (serial numbers 63-8058, 63-8059, 63-8060 and 63-8061) were given a unique designation KC-135D as they differed from the KC-135A in that they were built with a flight engineer's position on the flight deck. The flight engineer's position was removed when the aircraft were modified to KC-135 standards but they retained their electrically powered wing flap secondary (emergency) drive mechanism and second air conditioning pack which had been used to cool the RC-135As on-board photo-mapping systems. Later re-engined with Pratt & Whitney TF33 engines and a cockpit update to KC-135E standards in 1990 and were retired to the 309th AMARG at Davis-Monthan AFB, AZ in 2007.
KC-135E
Air National Guard and Air Force Reserve KC-135As re-engined with Pratt & Whitney TF33-PW-102 engines from retired 707 airliners (161 modified). All E model aircraft were retired to the 309th AMARG at Davis-Monthan AFB by September 2009 and replaced with R models.
NKC-135E
Test-configured KC-135E. 55-3132 NKC-135E "Big Crow I" & 63-8050 NKC-135B "Big Crow II" used as airborne targets for the Boeing YAL-1 Airborne Laser carrier.
KC-135Q
KC-135As modified to carry JP-7 fuel necessary for the SR-71 Blackbird, 56 modified, survivors to KC-135T.
KC-135R (1960s)
4 JC/KC-135As converted to Rivet Stand (Later Rivet Quick) configuration for reconnaissance and evaluation of above ground nuclear test (55-3121, 59–1465, 59–1514, 58–0126; 58-0126 replaced 59-1465 after it crashed in 1967).  These aircraft were powered by Pratt & Whitney J57 engines and were based at Offutt AFB, Nebraska.
KC-135R
KC-135As and some KC-135Es re-engined with CFM56 engines, more than 417 converted
KC-135R(RT)
Receiver-capable KC-135R Stratotanker; eight modified with either a Boeing or LTV receiver system and a secure voice SATCOM radio. Three of the aircraft (60-0356, -0357, and -0362) were converted to tankers from RC-135Ds, from which they retained their added equipment.

KC-135T
KC-135Q re-engined with CFM56 engines, 54 modified.
C-135F
A new-built variant for France as dual-role tanker/cargo and troop carrier aircraft. 12 were built for the French Air Force with the addition of a drogue adapter on the refueling boom. Given Boeing model numbers 717-164 and 717-165.
C-135FR
11 surviving C-135Fs upgraded with CFM International F108 turbofans between 1985 and 1988. Later modified with MPRS wing pods.
EC-135Y
An airborne command post modified in 1984 to support CINCCENT.  Aircraft 55-3125 was the only EC-135Y.  Unlike its sister EC-135N, it was a true tanker that could also receive in-flight refueling. Pratt & Whitney TF33-PW-102.  Retired to 309th AMARG at Davis-Monthan AFB, AZ.

Operators

 Chilean Air Force operates 3 KC-135Es.  It received its first KC-135E in February 2010.

 French Air and Space Force operates 11 C-135FRs and 3 KC-135Rs, which are being replaced by 15 Airbus A330 MRTTs, French military designation Phénix, from 2018 to 2023.

 Turkish Air Force operates 7 KC-135Rs.

 United States Air Force operates 398 KC-135s (156 Active duty, 70 Air Force Reserve, and 172 Air National Guard) .
 57th Wing – Nellis Air Force Base, Nevada
509th Weapons Squadron  – Fairchild Air Force Base, Washington
 97th Air Mobility Wing  – Altus Air Force Base, Oklahoma
54th Air Refueling Squadron
 412th Test Wing – Edwards AFB, California
412th Flight Test Squadron
418th Flight Test Squadron 
 6th Air Refueling Wing – MacDill AFB, Florida
50th Air Refueling Squadron
91st Air Refueling Squadron
99th Air Refueling Squadron – Birmingham Air National Guard Base, Alabama (Associate with 117th ARW)
 22d Air Refueling Wing – McConnell AFB, Kansas
349th Air Refueling Squadron
350th Air Refueling Squadron
 92d Air Refueling Wing – Fairchild AFB, Washington
92d Air Refueling Squadron
93d Air Refueling Squadron
97th Air Refueling Squadron
384th Air Refueling Squadron
912th Air Refueling Squadron – March ARB, California (Associate with 452d ARW)
 375th Air Mobility Wing – Scott AFB, Illinois
906th Air Refueling Squadron (associate with 126th ARW)
 18th Wing – Kadena AB, Japan
909th Air Refueling Squadron
 100th Air Refueling Wing – RAF Mildenhall, England, UK
351st Air Refueling Squadron
Air Force Reserve
 434th Air Refueling Wing – Grissom ARB, Indiana
72d Air Refueling Squadron
74th Air Refueling Squadron
 452d Air Mobility Wing – March ARB, California
336th Air Refueling Squadron
 459th Air Refueling Wing – Andrews AFB, Maryland
756th Air Refueling Squadron
 507th Air Refueling Wing – Tinker AFB, Oklahoma
465th Air Refueling Squadron
730th Air Mobility Training Squadron (Altus AFB, Oklahoma)
914th Air Refueling Wing - Niagara Falls International Airport, New York
328th Air Refueling Squadron
 927th Air Refueling Wing – MacDill AFB, Florida (Associate with 6th AMW)
63d Air Refueling Squadron
 931st Air Refueling Group – McConnell AFB, Kansas (Associate with 22d ARW)
18th Air Refueling Squadron
 940th Air Refueling Wing – Beale AFB, California
314th Air Refueling Squadron
Air National Guard
 101st Air Refueling Wing – Bangor, Maine
132d Air Refueilng Squadron
 108th Wing  – McGuire AFB, New Jersey
141st Air Refueling Squadron
 117th Air Refueling Wing – Birmingham, Alabama
106th Air Refueling Squadron
 121st Air Refueling Wing  – Rickenbacker ANGB, Ohio
166th Air Refueling Squadron
 126th Air Refueling Wing – Scott AFB, Illinois
108th Air Refueling Squadron
 127th Wing – Selfridge ANGB, Michigan
171st Air Refueling Squadron
 128th Air Refueling Wing – Milwaukee, Wisconsin
126th Air Refueling Squadron
 134th Air Refueling Wing – Knoxville, Tennessee
151st Air Refueling Squadron
 141st Air Refueling Wing – Fairchild AFB, Washington (Associate with 92d ARW)
116th Air Refueling Squadron
 151st Air Refueling Wing – Salt Lake City, Utah
191st Air Refueling Squadron
 154th Wing – Hickam AFB, Hawaii
203d Air Refueling Squadron
 155th Air Refueling Wing – Lincoln, Nebraska
173rd Air Refueling Squadron
 161st Air Refueling Wing – Phoenix Sky Harbor International Airport / Goldwater Air National Guard Base, Arizona
197th Air Refueling Squadron
 168th Air Refueling Wing – Eielson AFB, Alaska
168th Air Refueling Squadron
 171st Air Refueling Wing – Pittsburgh IAP Air Reserve Station, Pennsylvania
146th Air Refueling Squadron
147th Air Refueling Squadron
 185th Air Refueling Wing  – Sioux City, Iowa
174th Air Refueling Squadron
 186th Air Refueling Wing – Meridian, Mississippi
153d Air Refueling Squadron
 190th Air Refueling Wing – Topeka, Kansas
117th Air Refueling Squadron
 Meta Aerospace operates 4 KC-135Rs. These aircraft were purchased from the Republic of Singapore Air Force when the latter retired them in 2019. They were delivered in late 2020.

Note Italy has been reported in some sources as operating several KC-135s, however these are actually Boeing 707-300s converted to tanker configuration.

Former operators

 Republic of Singapore Air Force operated 4 former USAF KC-135R tankers, first delivered September 10, 1999; they were occasionally used as VIP, aeromedical transports and military support. The aircraft were retired in June 2019, having been replaced in service by 6 Airbus A330 MRTTs. They were subsequently purchased by private US defence services company Meta Aerospace in October 2020.

 NASA (until 2004)
 United States Air Force
 6th Air Refueling Wing – MacDill AFB, Florida
911th Air Refueling Squadron – Seymour-Johnson AFB, North Carolina (Associate with 916th ARW)
 22d Air Refueling Wing – McConnell AFB, Kansas
344th Air Refueling Squadron
 97th Air Mobility Wing  – Altus Air Force Base, Oklahoma
55th Air Refueling Squadron (1994-2009)
 916th Air Refueling Wing – Seymour Johnson AFB, North Carolina
77th Air Refueling Squadron
 931st Air Refueling Group – McConnell AFB, Kansas (Associate with 22d ARW)
924th Air Refueling Squadron
 Air National Guard
 107th Air Refueling Wing – Niagara Falls ARS, New York
 136th Air Refueling Squadron (1994–2008)
 121st Air Refueling Wing – Rickenbacker ANGB, Ohio
 145th Air Refueling Squadron (1975–2013)
 137th Air Refueling Wing – Tinker AFB, Oklahoma
 185th Air Refueling Squadron (2008–2015)
 157th Air Refueling Wing –  Pease ANGB, New Hampshire 
 133d Air Refueling Squadron (1975–2019)
 163rd Air Refueling Wing – March ARB, California
 196th Air Refueling Squadron (1993–2006)
 184th Air Refueling Wing – McConnell AFB, Kansas
 127th Air Refueling Squadron (2002–2008)
 189th Air Refueling Wing – Little Rock AFB, Arkansas
 154th Air Refueling Squadron (1973–1986)

Accidents

As of 2020, 52 Stratotankers have been lost to accidents during the over sixty years of service, involving 385 fatalities.

27 June 1958 USAF KC-135A, serial number 56-3599, stalled and crashed at Westover Air Force Base after the crew failed to extend the flaps on takeoff, killing all 15 on board. The aircraft was attempting a world speed record between New York and London.
31 March 1959 USAF KC-135A, 58-0002, entered a thunderstorm near Killeen, Texas. Two engines separated and one of the engines struck the tail, causing loss of control. The aircraft crashed on a hillside, killing all four crew on board. The aircraft had been delivered just six weeks before the accident.
3 February 1960 USAF KC-135A, 56–3628, crashed on takeoff in extremely gusty crosswind conditions at Roswell-Walker AFB, NM.  The airplane skidded into two other KC-135 tankers (57-1449 and 57–1457) and a hangar and burst into flames.  The aircraft was on a training flight, but the instructor pilot was occupying the jump seat instead of one of the pilot seats as directed by the local commander.  The destruction of three aircraft, along with the death of all six in the crew plus an additional two deaths on the ground made this a unique mishap.
18 November 1960 USAF KC-135A, 56-3605, crashed on landing at Loring Air Force Base due to an excessive sink rate, killing one of 17 on board.
9 May 1962 USAF KC-135A, 56-3618, crashed on takeoff from Loring Air Force Base due to engine failure, killing all six on board.
8 August 1962 USAF KC-135A, 55-3144, crashed on approach to Runway 11 at Hanscom Field in Bedford, Massachusetts, killing all three on board. Stock footage of this same aircraft had been used during the opening credits of the film Dr. Strangelove.
10 September 1962 USAF KC-135A, 60-0352 on a flight from Ellsworth Air Force Base to Fairchild Air Force Base crashed into a mountain just 20 miles (32 km) northeast of Spokane, Washington. The flight hit fog on approach to the air base and hit Mount Kit Carson, a  mountain. The crash killed all four crew and 40 passengers on board.
27 February 1963 USAF KC-135A, 56-3597, crashed on takeoff at Eielson Air Force Base due to engine separation, killing all seven on board; two on the ground died when debris from the crash struck a guard house and nearby waiting room.
21 June 1963 USAF KC-135A-BN Stratotanker, 57-1498 out of Westover AFB crashed on approach during a training flight in a wooded area near Belchertown, MA. One of the four occupants was killed.
8 July 1964 USAF KC-135A, 60-0340, collided in mid-air with F-105 Thunderchief 61-0091 during in-flight refueling over Death Valley, California, killing all five on board both aircraft.
4 January 1965 USAF KC-135A, 61-0265, crashed on climbout from Loring Air Force Base after two engines separated, killing all four on board.
16 January 1965 USAF KC-135A 57-1442, crashed after its rudder control system suffered a malfunction shortly after takeoff from McConnell Air Force Base, Kansas. The fuel-laden plane crashed in northeast Wichita at a street intersection and caused a considerable fire. A total of 30 were killed, including 23 on the ground and the seven member crew.
26 February 1965 USAF KC-135A, 63-8882, collided in mid-air with B-47E 52-0171 over the Atlantic Ocean, killing all eight on board both aircraft.
3 June 1965 USAF KC-135A, 63-0842, lost electrical power on takeoff and crashed at Walker Air Force Base, killing all five on board.
17 January 1966 A fatal collision occurred between a B-52G, 58-0256, and a KC-135A, 61-0273, flying out of Moron AB, Spain while flying over Palomares, Spain.  The B-52G was on an Operation Chrome Dome mission, which required multiple air refuelings. The mishap caused both aircraft to break up in mid-air and killed all four crew members on the KC-135A and three of the seven on the B-52G, while causing radiological contamination, as nuclear weapons had to be recovered from on land and at sea, nearby.
19 May 1966 USAF KC-135A, 57-1444, of 4252nd Strategic Wing, crashed on takeoff from Kadena Air Base, killing all 11 on board as well as a motorist on nearby Highway 16. The aircraft was bound for Yokota Air Base to repair a KC-135 when it lifted off too soon during a heavy-weight takeoff.
19 January 1967 USAF KC-135A, 56-3613, crashed into Shadow Mountain, foothill of Mount Spokane (elevation  MSL) while descending towards Fairchild Air Force Base, killing all nine on board.
17 January 1968 USAF KC-135A, 58-0026, stalled and crashed at Minot Air Force Base after the pilot overrotated the aircraft during takeoff in a snowstorm, killing all 13 on board including the 15th Air Force Vice Commander MGen Charles Eisenhart. This accident was instrumental in the decision to refit the KC-135 fleet with the Collins FD-109(V) integrated flight director system, in place of the earlier "round dial" cockpit layout.
30 July 1968 USAF KC-135A, 56-3655, crashed on Mount Lassen after the vertical stabilizer broke off after a sharp turn while practicing an emergency descent, killing all nine on board.
24 September 1968 USAF KC-135A, "55-3133A", crashed on landing at Wake Island, Micronesia.  Aircraft developed engine problems while en route from Andersen AFB, Guam to Hickam AFB, HI and during landing at Wake Island the aircraft contacted the surface of the water and bounced onto the east end of the runway. There were 11 fatalities out 56 persons on board.
1 October 1968 USAF KC-135A, 55-3138, struck concrete and steel light poles on takeoff and crashed at U-Tapao Airport, Thailand after a loss of power in an engine and resultant loss of control, killing all four on board.
22 October 1968 USAF KC-135A, 61-0301, flew into a mountain while descending to Ching Chuan Kang Air Base, Taiwan, killing all six on board.
19 December 1969 USAF KC-135A, 56-3629, crashed into the sea on climbout from Ching Chuan Kang Air Base due to low-level windshear, killing all four on board.
3 June 1971 USAF KC-135Q, 58-0039, exploded in mid-air and crashed at Centenera, Spain, killing all five on board.
13 March 1972 KC-135A, 58-0048, crashed while landing at Carswell AFB.  Its right wing struck the ground, which led to the airplane exploding and killing all 5 on board.
8 March 1973 USAF KC-135A, 63-7989, collided with KC-135 63-7980 on the ramp at Lockbourne Air Force Base and caught fire, killing two of five on board.
7 December 1975 USAF KC-135A, 60-0354, from Plattsburgh AFB, NY, crashed after takeoff at Eielson AFB, AK, killing all four crewmembers. Launch was delayed because of problems with the receiver aircraft. The KC-135 was required to sit at the end of the runway in extremely cold weather, without heat, with engines shut down. Repeated requests for a mobile heat source were denied by the command post. Landing gear failed to retract after takeoff. Crewmembers may have suffered from hypothermia.
6 February 1976 USAF KC-135A, 60-0368, flew into a mountain while descending to Torrejon Air Base, Spain, killing all seven on board.  The aircraft was assigned to the 410th BMW/46th AREFS at K.I. Sawyer AFB, Michigan, but, as is often the case on Tanker Task Force deployed operations, the flight crew was from another SAC unit at Seymour-Johnson AFB, NC. Only two aircraft crew chiefs on board were from K I Sawyer AFB, MI.
26 September 1976 USAF KC-135A, 61-0296, crashed while on approach to Wurtsmith Air Force Base, Michigan, killing 15 passengers and flight crew on board. The aircraft was flying a "First Team" mission taking 10 passengers to HQ-Strategic Air Command for briefings and orientation. There was one survivor, reportedly a crew chief who was in the boom operator aft station (boom pod) at the time of the crash.
29 April 1977 USAF KC-135A, 58-0101 from Castle AFB hit five or six cows while practicing night takeoffs and landings at Beale AFB.  Takeoff was aborted and the plane overran the runway and caught on fire. Of the crew of 7, there were no fatalities.  During that time cattle strayed through a broken fence from a nearby field and onto the runway.
19 September 1979 USAF KC-135A, 58-0127, from Castle AFB crashed on the runway during a simulated engine failure on a training flight, killing 15 of 20 occupants on board.
13 March 1982 Arizona ANG KC-135A, 57-1489 collided in mid-air with a civilian Grumman-American AA-1 Yankee near Luke AFB, AZ.  The collision, which occurred as the tanker was descending on an IFR flight plan through an undercast, was struck by the civilian aircraft operating VFR just below the cloud deck, causing the tail of the KC-135 to be severed by the force of the impact.  The two civilians on the AA-1 and all four crew on the KC-135 were killed. Included among the dead was the squadron commander of the 197th AREFS, Lt Col James N. Floor.
19 March 1985 USAF 8th AF KC-135A 61-0316 caught fire during ground refueling at Cairo International Airport (CAI), Cairo, Egypt. The interior of the airplane was burned out and the aircraft was written off as damaged beyond repair although the wing structure was used in repairing KC-135A 58-0014 (which was later converted to a KC-135E). There were no injuries reported.
28 August 1985 USAF KC-135A 59-1443 was damaged beyond repair when a student pilot allowed an engine to contact the runway during a landing attempt at Beale Air Force Base near Marysville, California. During the go-around the instructor lost control of the aircraft while performing checklist items for an in-flight fire. All seven (three instructors and four students) aboard the aircraft died in the crash.
17 June 1986 USAF KC-135A,63-7983, crashed while en route to Howard AFB, Panama. It struck a hill south of the nearby Rodman Naval Station, killing all four crew members on board. The tanker and crew were based at Grissom Air Force Base, Indiana.
13 March 1987 USAF KC-135A, 60-0361, crashed at Fairchild Air Force Base after encountering wake turbulence from a B-52, while practicing a low-level refueling display.  The aircraft rolled 80 degrees to the left, which stalled both left side engines (#1 and #2).  The crew was able to recover to wings level, but were too low and impacted the ground in an open area of the base.  The accident killed all six on board and one person on the ground.
11 October 1988 USAF KC-135A, 60-0317, crashed at Wurtsmith Force Base after a hard landing following a steep approach during crosswinds. The airplane went off the side of the runway and broke up. A fire erupted and killed all six crewmembers on board, while 10 passengers were able to jump to safety. Pilot error was determined as the cause of the accident.
20 November 1988 USAF KC-135 suffered a failure of a sighting window next to the sextant port in the cockpit during a trans-Atlantic flight.  A boom operator died when he was sucked partway through the 10-inch by 8-inch window opening as the cockpit depressurized.  None of the 17 others on board were injured.
31 January 1989 USAF KC-135A, 63-7990, crashed on takeoff from Dyess AFB, TX after the water-injection system for the Pratt & Whitney J-57 engines failed and the remaining "dry" thrust was insufficient for flight at the takeoff gross weight.  The mission was scheduled as a non-stop flight to Hickam AFB/Honolulu HI with an en route F-16 air refueling mission.  7 crew members and 12 passengers, including military spouses, retired military members and one child, were killed. The aircraft and crew were based at K I Sawyer AFB, MI.
20 September 1989 USAF KC-135E, 57-1481, exploded on the ground at Eielson Air Force Base due to an overheated fuel pump, killing two of seven on board. The crew was shutting down the engines when the explosion occurred.
4 October 1989 KC-135A, 56-3592, from en route from Loring Air Force Base crashed into a hill along the west side of Trans-Canada Highway 2 at Carlingford, New Brunswick due to an overheated fuel pump, killing all four crew members. After five accidents involving fuel pump overheating, crews were to keep  of fuel in the tank.
11 January 1990 KC-135E, 59-1494, caught fire on the tarmac at Pease Air National Guard Base during maintenance work; there were no injuries, however the aircraft was destroyed.
6 February 1991 KC-135E, call sign "Whale 05", 58-0013 , flown by Maj. Kevin Sweeney (pilot), Capt. Jay Selanders (co-pilot), Capt. Greg Mermis (navigator), and Senior Master Sgt. Steve Stucky (boom operator), during the Gulf War, after entering severe wake turbulence from a passing KC-135, the plane lost both engines from under the left wing. The crew landed it successfully and it was later returned in service. The entire crew received the Distinguished Flying Cross for their actions. This accident was covered in Air Disasters episode "Mission Disaster" in 2021.
10 December 1993 a Wisconsin Air National Guard KC-135R, 57-1470, exploded while undergoing routine ground maintenance at General Mitchell Air National Guard Base due to an overheated fuel pump.  Six NCO maintenance personnel were killed.
13 January 1999 Washington Air National Guard KC-135E, 59-1452, crashed on approach in Geilenkirchen, Germany due to the horizontal stabilizer being in a 7.5 nose-up trim condition, killing all 4 crew members.
7 April 1999 Air National Guard KC-135R, 57-1418, was damaged beyond repair while undergoing a cabin pressurization check while in depot maintenance at the Oklahoma City Air Logistics Center at Tinker AFB, Oklahoma.  During a previous maintenance event, the pressure relief valves were secured shut and not released afterwards.  This created a catastrophic explosion that nearly separated the empennage from the aircraft and destroyed the aft fuselage section.  No personnel were injured or killed during the mishap, but the aircraft was a total loss. 
26 September 2006 USAF KC-135R, 63-8886, was damaged beyond economical repair when it was struck by a Tupolev Tu-154 of Altyn Air, EX-85718, while stopped on a taxiway after landing at Manas Air Base. As the Tu-154 took off, its right wing struck the fairing of the KC-135R's No. 1 engine. The force of the impact nearly severed the No. 1 engine and destroyed a portion of the left wing. The resulting fire caused extensive damage to the KC-135. The tanker crew had been directed to use a taxiway which was not usable for night operations and the controller failed to note that they reported "holding short" of that taxiway, rather than "clear of" that point. The crew of the KC-135 evacuated the aircraft without serious injuries.
3 May 2013 A McConnell AFB, KS (USAF) KC-135R, 63-8877, flown by a Fairchild AFB, Washington aircrew, broke up in flight about eight minutes after taking off from Manas Air base in Kyrgyzstan, killing all three crew members. After investigation, it was determined that a rudder power control unit malfunction led to a Dutch roll oscillatory instability. Not recognizing the Dutch roll, the crew used the rudder to stay on course, which exacerbated the instability, leading to an unrecoverable flight condition. The over-stressed tail section detached and the aircraft broke apart soon after. The aircraft was at cruise altitude about 200 km west of Bishkek before it crashed in a mountainous area near the village of Chorgolu, close to the border between Kyrgyzstan and Kazakhstan.

Aircraft on display
 55-3118 The City of Renton – KC-135A on static display at the entrance to McConnell Air Force Base, Kansas. It was the first aircraft built and was used in a variety of test roles. It was later converted to an EC-135K before reverting to a tanker configuration.
 55-3130 Old Grandad – KC-135A on static display at the March Field Air Museum, March ARB, California.
 55-3139 City of Atwater – KC-135A on static display at the Castle Air Museum at the former Castle AFB, California.
 56-3595 – KC-135A on static display at the Barksdale Global Power Museum at Barksdale Air Force Base, Louisiana.
 56-3611 – KC-135E on static display Scott Field Heritage Air Park at Scott Air Force Base, Illinois.
 56-3639 – KC-135A on static display at the Linear Air Park at Dyess Air Force Base, Texas.
 56-3658 Iron Eagle – KC-135E on static display at the Kansas Aviation Museum.
 57-1429 – KC-135E on static display at the Museum of the Kansas National Guard at Forbes Field Air National Guard Base in Topeka, Kansas.
 57-1458 – KC-135E on static display at Eielson Air Force Base, Alaska.
 57-1495 – KC-135E in storage at Lincoln Air National Guard Base, Nebraska.
 57-1507 – KC-135E on static display at the Air Mobility Command Museum at Dover Air Force Base, Delaware.
 57-1510 Never Forget – KC-135E on static display at the Hill Aerospace Museum at Hill Air Force Base, Utah.
 59-1481 – KC-135A on static display at Ellington Field Joint Reserve Base, Texas. It was operated by NASA as N930NA and one of two KC-135s used for zero-gravity and other research purposes.
 59-1487 – KC-135E on static display at the 126th Air Refueling Wing / Illinois Air National Guard complex at Scott Air Force Base.
 59-1497 – KC-135E on static display at Joint Base McGuire-Dix-Lakehurst, New Jersey.
 60-0329 – KC-135R stored at the National Museum of the United States Air Force in Dayton, Ohio, pending future display.
 63-7998 – KC-135A on static display at the Pima Air & Space Museum, adjacent to Davis-Monthan AFB, Arizona. It was operated by NASA as N931NA and is the second of their two research aircraft.
 63-8005 – KC-135A on static display at Grand Forks AFB, North Dakota.

Specifications (KC-135R)

See also

References

Bibliography

External links

 USAF KC-135 fact sheet and photo gallery at official USAF website
 KC-135 history page and KC-135 image gallery on Boeing.com
 KC-135 page on awacs-spotter.nl
 Photo gallery of NASA's KC-135A tanker
 KC-135 page at fas.org - (not updated since late 1999, but still perhaps useful)
 C-135 page at aero-web.org - Includes specs for many variants
 Smart Tankers (Defence Today)
 
 National Museum of the Air Force video tour of KC-135

Air refueling
KC-135 Stratotanker
KC-135 Stratotanker
Quadjets
Low-wing aircraft
Aircraft first flown in 1956